Department of Works may refer to:

 Department of Works (1938–39), an Australian government department
 Department of Works (1945), an Australian government department
 Department of Works (1952–73), an Australian government department